Ruxton may refer to:

Places

 Ruxton, a place in Herefordshire, England
 Ruxton-Riderwood, Maryland, United States
 Ruxton Creek, Manitou Springs, Colorado, United States
 Ruxton Island, near Vancouver, Canada
 Ruxton Park, Manitou Springs, Colorado, United States

People

Surname

 Bruce Ruxton (1926–2011), Australian veteran
 Buck Ruxton (1899–1936), physician and convicted murderer
 Charles Ruxton (1726–1806), Irish landowner and Member of Parliament
 George Ruxton (1821–1848), British explorer and travel writer
 Graeme Ruxton, ecologist
 John Ruxton (1721–1785), Irish landowner and Member of Parliament
 William Parkinson Ruxton (1766–1847), Irish Member of Parliament
 William Ruxton (1697–1751), Irish landowner and Member of Parliament

Given name

 Nicholas Ruxton Moore (1756–1816), United States Representative from Maryland
 Ruxton Hayward (1930–2011), British eccentric said to have inspired the character Bluebottle in The Goon Show
 William Ruxton Davison (died 1893), British ornithologist and collector

Other

 Ruxton (automobile), produced 1929–1931 in the United States